Karlukovo is a village in Lukovit Municipality, Lovech Province, northwestern Bulgaria.

References

Villages in Lovech Province